Tilokpur  is a village in the Tilhar in the Indian state of Uttar Pradesh. The village is situated near the Sharda Canal that passes through Kant and Kurriya Kalan.

The village is medium-sized, with around 167 dwellings and a population of about 1,036 people.
The Part of City Tilhar

Banwari Lal, by caste a Kayastha, an Indian revolutionary and an approver in the historical Kakori conspiracy train robbery case of 1925, hailed from this village. Later in his life, he settled in the nearby village of Keshawpur, where he lived until his death.

History
The village of Tilokpur, named after Trilok Chandra, a Bachhil Rajput, is situated about 9 kilometers to the south of Tilhar.
According to the Shahjahanpur Gazetteer, the name Tilhar was also derived from the Bachhil Rajput Trilok Chandra. Trilok Chandra also built a fort in Tilhar. The ruins of this fort can be seen in Dataganj mohalla of Tilhar. There were three big gates to the fort though now only two of them still exist. The city of Shahjahanpur was established by Diler Khan and Bahadur Khan, sons of Shri Dariya Khan, who were the commanders in the army of Mugal Emperor Jahangir.

Demographics
Although this village is very old, many residents have moved and settled in other parts of the country due to communal conflicts. In the past, this village apparently had orchards with rare plant species and people lived in harmony. Today the village is all but abandoned.

The Hindu communities which still reside here are: Thakurs, Brahmins, Yadavs, Lohars, Barhais, Dhobis, Dahanuks Nats and Kahars. Amongst the Muslim community, some families of Manihars, Julahas and Faqirs remain in the village.

Another community of Kshatriya Sunars, who were the oldest residents of this village, have left. Kayasthas have also left the village though some families of Gadariyas remain. The departures are often due to the lack of educational opportunities.

The main occupation of the villagers is farming. Some Sikhs have also settled here but they do not mingle with the local residents. They live with family and their cattle in the Jhalas.

Sunars
The Sunars of this village claim that they are the descendants of one of two Rajput brothers, who were saved as boys by a Saraswat Brahman from the wrath of Parashurama when he was destroying the Kshatriyas. The descendants of the other brother were the Khatris. This is the same story as is told by the Khatris of their own origin, but they do not acknowledge the connection with Sunars, nor can the Sunars allege that Saraswat Brahmans eat with them as they do with Khatris.

Owing to their association with the sacred metal gold, and the fact that they generally live in towns or large villages, and that many of their members are well-to-do, the Sunars occupy a fairly high position, ranking equal with, or above the cultivating castes.

Religious Practices
Sacred fig trees grow in Tilokpur. These trees draw both Sadhus (ascetics), who meditate beneath the trees, and Hindus, who do pradakshina (circumambulation) around the trees as a form of worship. Usually seven pradakshinas are done in the morning, while the Hindu practitioner chants "Vriksha Rajaya Namah", meaning "salutation to the king of trees." 

Outside the village's boundary stands a Peepal tree, which the local people call Brahma dev. Here, a mela (gathering) is organised on the day of Buddha Purnima every year. This sacred tree is said to be about 1,000 years old. Its trunk is about 10 feet in diameter, upon which the natural images of the Brahma, Vishnu, and Mahesh are clearly visible.

The Brijbasi Nats – a landless community in Shahjahanpur district – are mainly musicians and dancers. At social functions, they are required to perform for their patrons, who tend to belong to the locally dominant castes. They come here every year and perform dances with music to entertain the God tree Brahma dev and the people on Buddha Purnima.

References

Villages in Shahjahanpur district